The 1988 Virginia Slims of Los Angeles was a women's tennis tournament played on outdoor hard courts at the Los Angeles Tennis Center in Los Angeles, California in the United States and was part of the Category 5 tier of the 1988 WTA Tour. The tournament ran from August 8 through August 14, 1988. First-seeded Chris Evert won the singles title and earned $60,000 first-prize money.

Finals

Singles

 Chris Evert defeated  Gabriela Sabatini 2–6, 6–1, 6–1
 It was Evert's 3rd singles title of the year and the 156th of her career.

Doubles

 Patty Fendick /  Jill Hetherington defeated  Gigi Fernández /  Robin White 7–6(7–2), 5–7, 6–4
 It was Fendick's 7th title of the year and the 7th of her career. It was Hetherington's 5th title of the year and the 6th of her career.

References

External links
 ITF tournament edition details
 Tournament draws

Virginia Slims of Los Angeles
LA Women's Tennis Championships
Virginia Slims of Los Angeles
Virginia Slims of Los Angeles
Virginia Slims of Los Angeles
Virginia Slims of Los Angeles